Edgar L. Harden (October 31, 1906 – May 2, 1996) was the president of Michigan State University from 1977 to 1979. Prior to that, he was president of Northern Michigan University from 1956 to 1967. During his presidency, enrollment grew from 800 to 7600, where the enrollment stands today.

External links
Biographical Information (Michigan State University Archives & Historical Collections)

1906 births
1996 deaths
Presidents of Michigan State University
20th-century American academics